The Abdullah Gul Interchange, named after Turkish President Abdullah Gül, is an  interchange of the Lahore Ring Road, giving access to the Allama Iqbal International Airport. The interchange was opened on April 1, 2010. It was completed at a cost of Rs. 2,275 million, in a record period of 7 months.

The opening ceremony was attended by Syed Yousaf Raza Gilani, Prime Minister of Pakistan and Mian Muhammad Shahbaz Sharif, the Punjab Chief Minister. Earlier, on March 16, 2010, the Punjab Chief Minister performed the soft opening of the interchange.

Construction details

See also

References

External links 
 World News
 LAHORE: Prime Minister Syed Yousuf Raza Gilani, Turkish President H.E Abdullah Gul in a group photograph with Pak-Turk school children after inaugurating Abdullah Gul Interchange
 Daily Times - Leading News Resource of Pakistan
 Lahore Ring Road Project – Help Us Build This Post : ALL THINGS PAKISTAN
 Habib Construction Services
 HCS – News
 NESPAK :: News Detail

Bridges in Pakistan
Roads in Lahore
Allama Iqbal International Airport
Pakistan–Turkey relations
Road interchanges in Pakistan